Nawal Saeed (born 30 October 1998) is a Pakistani actress and model. She is known for her roles in dramas Aik Larki Aam Si, Yaqeen Ka Safar, Mah-e-Tamaam, Faryaad and Banno.

Early life
Nawal was born in 1998 on 30th October in Karachi, Pakistan. She completed her studies and graduate from University of Karachi.

Career
Saeed made her acting debut in 2017 before acting she did commercials. She was noted for her roles in dramas Suno Na, Soteli Maamta and Bezuban with Usama Khan. She also appeared in dramas Yaqeen Ka Safar with Sajal Aly, Mah-e-Tamaam, Kabhi Band Kabhi Baja and Aik Larki Aam Si. Since then she appeared in dramas Dikhawa Season 2 and Makafaat Season 3. She also appeared in telefilm Bhabhi Nazar Laga Dengi along with Hina Dilpazeer, Behroze Sabzwari, Asma Abbas and Khaled Anam. In 2020 she appeared in drama Faryaad with Adeel Chaudhry and Zahid Ahmed.

Filmography

Television

Telefilm

Film

References

External links
 
 
 
 

1998 births
Living people
Pakistani television actresses
21st-century Pakistani actresses
Pakistani film actresses
Actresses in Urdu cinema